This list of the prehistoric life of Connecticut contains the various prehistoric life-forms whose fossilized remains have been reported from within the US state of Connecticut.

Precambrian-Paleozoic
The Paleobiology Database records no known occurrences of Precambrian or Paleozoic fossils in Connecticut.

Mesozoic
 †Acanthichnus
 †Acanthichnus cursorius
 †Anchisauripus
 †Anchisauripus exsertus
 †Anchisauripus giganteus – type locality for species
 †Anchisauripus hitchcocki
 †Anchisauripus parallelus
 †Anchisauripus sillimani
 †Anchisauripus tuberosus
  †Anchisaurus
 †Anchisaurus polyzelus – type locality for species
 †Ancyropus – type locality for genus
 †Ancyropus heteroclitus – type locality for species
 †Anomoepus
 †Anomoepus curvatus
 †Anomoepus gracillimus
 †Anomoepus intermedius
 †Argoides
 †Argoides macrodactylus – type locality for species
 †Argoides minimus – type locality for species
 †Baiera
 †Batrachopus
 †Batrachopus barrattii
 †Batrachopus deweyi
 †Batrachopus dispar
 †Batrachopus gracilis
 †Belodon
 †Belodon validus – type locality for species
 †Bisulcus
 Botryopera
 †Brontozoum
 †Brontozoum divaricatum
 †Brontozoum giganteum
 †Brontozoum isodactylum
 †Brontozoum sillimanium
 †Cochlichnus
  †Coelophysis
 †Conopsoides
 †Conopsoides larvalis
 †Corvipes
 †Corvipes lacertoideus
 †Cunichoides
 †Cunichoides marsupialoideus – type locality for species
 †Cunicularius
 †Cunicularius retrahens
 †Erpetosuchus
  †Eubrontes
 †Eubrontes approximatus
 †Eubrontes dananus – type locality for species
 †Eubrontes divaricatus
 †Eubrontes giganteus
 †Gigandipus
 †Gigandipus caudatus
  †Grallator
 †Grallator cuneatus
 †Grallator cursorius
 †Grallator formosus
 †Grallator magnificus
 †Grallator tenuis
 †Harpedactylus
 †Harpedactylus tenuissimus – type locality for species
 †Herpystezoum
 †Herpystezoum minutus
 †Holcoptera
 †Holcoptera giebeli
 †Hoplichnus
 †Hoplichnus equus
  †Hypsognathus
 †Hypsognathus fenneri
 †Isocampe
 †Isocampe strata
 †Loperia
 †Mormolucoides
 †Mormolucoides articulatus
 †Ornithoidichnites
 †Ornithoidichnites gracillior – type locality for species
 †Ornithoidichnites sillimani – type locality for species
  †Otozoum
 †Otozoum moodii
 †Palamopus
 †Palamopus divaricans
 †Platypterna
 †Platypterna deanii – type locality for species
 †Platypterna delicatula – type locality for species
 †Platypterna tenuis – type locality for species
 †Plectropterna
 †Plectropterna gracilis
 †Plectropterna lineans
 †Plectropterna minitans
 †Plectropus
 †Plectropus longipes
 †Plesiornis
 †Redfieldius
 †Redfieldius gracilis
  †Semionotus
 †Semionotus agassizi
 †Semionotus tenuiceps
 †Sillimanius
 †Sillimanius gracilior – type locality for species
 †Sillimanius tetradactylus – type locality for species
 †Stegomus – type locality for genus
 †Stegomus arcuatus – type locality for species
 †Steropoides
 †Steropoides divaricatus
 †Steropoides diversus
 †Steropoides infelix
 †Steropoides loripes
 †Tarsoplectrus
 †Tarsoplectrus elegans – type locality for species
 †Triaenopus
 †Triaenopus baileyanus – type locality for species
 †Triaenopus lulli – type locality for species
 †Trihamus
 †Trihamus elegans
 †Trihamus magnus
 †Typopus
 †Typopus gracilis – type locality for species

Cenozoic
The Paleobiology Database records no known occurrences of Cenozoic fossils in Connecticut.

References
 

Connecticut